A frazione is a type of subdivision of a comune (municipality) in Italy, often a small village or hamlet outside the main town. Most frazioni were created during the Fascist era (1922–1943) as a way to consolidate territorial subdivisions in the country.

In the autonomous region of the Aosta Valley, a frazione is officially called an hameau in French.

Description
Typically the term frazioni applies to the villages surrounding the main town (capoluogo) of a comune. Subdivision of a comune is optional; some comuni have no frazioni, but others have several dozen. The comune usually has the same name of the capoluogo, but not always, in which case it is called a comune sparso.

In practice, most frazioni are small villages or hamlets, occasionally just a clump of houses. Not every hamlet is classified as a frazione; those that are not are often referred to as località, for example, in the telephone book. In some cases, frazioni are more populous than the capoluogo of the comune. Due to unusual circumstances or to the depopulation of the capoluogo, the town hall and its administrative functions can move to one of the frazioni: the comune still retains the name of the capoluogo.

History
Historically, many frazioni came into being during the Fascist era, when a major effort was made to consolidate and rationalize the territorial subdivisions of the country. Sometimes, a frazione represents a former comune that was believed to be no longer viable.

Until 2000, the central government established the frazioni and defined their borders, except in the case of the five autonomous regions (see Regions of Italy), where this was controlled at the regional level. By the Legislative Decree 267/2000 to implement amendments to Title V of the Italian Constitution, the individual comuni now define the frazioni within their borders.

Officers
Under the former legislation, a frazione had the option of having a prosindaco (submayor), who was appointed by the mayor (il sindaco) of the comune, often on the recommendation of deliberative bodies such as the communal council (consiglio) or the giunta, or as a result of a petition by enough residents of the frazione involved; although there was no official provision for frazioni to group together with the appointment of a single prosindaco, this did happen quite often. Under current law, however, Article 54 of the d.lgs. 267/2000 provides that a mayor may delegate mayoral functions at the frazione level to a councillor of the comune.

In many comuni, in addition to their advisory function, the frazioni have their clerks and recorders of deeds, but they do not maintain their own civil records.

See also

 Circoscrizione
 Contrada
 Località
 Rione
Rioni of Rome
 Quartiere
 Sestiere
 Terziere

 
Types of administrative division
Italian words and phrases